Felicitas Grolandin is a 1923 German silent film directed by Rudolf Biebrach and starring Hella Moja, Hans Marr and Theodor Becker.

The film's sets were designed by the art director Gustav A. Knauer. Location shooting took place in Bamberg in Bavaria.

Cast
 Hella Moja
 Hans Marr
 Theodor Becker
 Rudolf Biebrach
 Hans Karl Georg
 Fritz Richard
 Kurt Vespermann
 Margit von Banlaky
 Leopold von Ledebur
 Carl Zickner

References

Bibliography
 Alfred Krautz. International directory of cinematographers, set- and costume designers in film, Volume 4. Saur, 1984.

External links

1923 films
Films of the Weimar Republic
German silent feature films
Films directed by Rudolf Biebrach
German black-and-white films
Films set in the 17th century
Cultural depictions of Gustavus Adolphus of Sweden
1920s historical films
German historical films
1920s German films